The Timor-Leste national Under-20 football team is the national team of Timor-Leste and is controlled by the Federação de Futebol de Timor-Leste. East Timor joined FIFA on 12 September 2005, but has never had success on the international stage.

Kits
Timor-Leste 's kit is a red jersey, red shorts and red socks. Their away kit is with a white jersey with black shorts and red or white socks. The kits are currently manufactured by Adidas and Nike. Timor-Leste first kit is under Tiger, when the team play for the 2004 Tiger Cup. The first kit is red jersey, black shorts and red sock and their away kit is white jersey with two black sleeves, black short and white socks.

Results and Fixtures
International Matches in last 12 months, and future scheduled matches

2022

Competition records

FIFA U-20 World Cup record

AFC U-19 Championship record

AFF U-19 Youth Championship record
{| class="wikitable" style="text-align: center;"
!colspan=9|AFF U-19 Youth Championship
|-
!Year
!Round
!Position
!GP
!W
!D
!L
!GF
!GA
|-
|  2002||colspan=8|did not exist, under United Nations
|-
|  2003||colspan=8|did not enter
|-
||| ||9th|| || || || || ||
|-
|||colspan=8 rowspan=3|
|-
|
|-
|
|-
||| ||8th|| || || || || ||
|-
|
|rowspan="3" colspan="8"|did not enter|-
|
|-
|
|-style="background-color:#cc9966;"
|||| ||3rd|| || || || || ||
|-
||
| colspan="8"|did not enter|-
|||| ||9th|| || || || || ||
|-style="background-color:#9acdff;"
|||| ||4th|| || || || || ||
|-
||||rowspan=4|Group stage ||6th|| || || || || ||
|-
||||8th|| || || || || ||
|-
||||7th|| || || || || ||
|-
|
|6th
|4
|2
|0
|2
|8
|7
|-
! ||||9/18 || || || || || ||
|}

Coaching staff

Squad

Current squad
The following players who are call-up for the 2022 AFF U-19 Youth Championship

Head Coach:

Stadium
 East Timor National Stadium    (2002-present'')

References

External links
 Profile at FIFA.com
 Profile at the-AFC.com
 Profile at AFF Suzuki Cup Site
 Profile at AFF Site
 Profile at National-football-teams.com

u19
Football